The Museum of Avant-Garde Mastery (MAGMA) is a continually renewed collection of hundreds of artworks, including paintings by famous Russian artists of Jewish origin, photographs, masterpieces of sculpture and graphic design. MAGMA’s collection includes works by Valentin Serov, Léon Bakst, Marc Chagall, El Lissitzky, Chaïm Soutine, Amedeo Modigliani, Erik Bulatov, Ilya Kabakov, etc. The Museum was established in 2001. MAGMA President is Viatcheslav Moshe Kantor.

The collection also contains works by famous 20th-century photographers Lev Ivanov, Ivan Shagin, and Lev Borodulin, as well as masterpieces by contemporary western artists, in particular well-known photos by Helmut Newton.

The Museum’s mission lies in disseminating the ideas of tolerance and reconciliation in the world and uniting humanity to face the challenges posed by terrorism, xenophobia and anti-Semitism. MAGMA’s collection shows the vital importance of the cultural component in modern life and the significant role art plays in uniting society. According to MAGMA’s main ideologist Viatcheslav Moshe Kantor, “It is a tolerant environment that promotes art and vice versa. This is the specific message which our museum is sending humanity, and I will be happy if this message is heard”.

In June 2009, MAGMA’s first exhibition, called “My Homeland is within My Soul: Art without Borders,” opened in the Palace of Nations in Geneva, Switzerland, which now hosts the UN European Office. It is no coincidence that the Palace of Nations was chosen to host the exhibition, because it is the citadel of diplomacy, security and tolerance, which has housed two major international organisations.

The exhibition received widespread coverage in European and Russian media.

Second exhibition of the MAGMA Museum called "My Homeland Is Within My Soul" took its place at the Pushkin State Museum of Fine Arts in Moscow from December 2013 until February 2014.

In 2018, President of the Russian Academy of Arts and People’s Artist of the URSS Zurab Tsereteli officially awarded the robe and diploma of Honorary Member of the Russian Academy of Arts to the President of the Museum of Avant-Garde Mastery Viatcheslav Kantor.

Media on the MAGMA exhibition
 Russian Billionaire Kantor Reveals Chagall, Rothko Paintings, Bloomberg, June 11, 2009.
 Jewish art exhibit joins fight against racism, Ynetnews.com, June 14, 2009.
 Les trésors d'un oligarque russe sortis de l'ombre, Le Monde, June 14, 2009.

References

External links
 Museum of Avant-Garde Mastery, page at the official website of Viatcheslav Moshe Kantor
  MAGMA Museum, official website

Art museums and galleries in Russia
Museum of Avant-Garde Mastery
Art museums established in 2001
Museum of Avant-Garde Mastery